The Circus Maximus is an album released under the name of American heavy metal band Manilla Road in 1992, after the band had first split up. The album contains the work of Manilla Road founder and frontman Mark Shelton who assembled a new band named Circus Maximus. However, Shelton's label, Black Dragon Records, added the Manilla Road logo. The sound and style is very different than the rest of Manilla Road material.

Track listing 
 "Throne of Blood" – 5:01
 "Lux Aeterna" – 8:01
 "Spider" – 7:15
 "Murder by Degrees" – 4:28
 "No Sign From Above" – 5:23
 "In Gein We Trust" – 6:47
 "Flesh and Fury" – 4:11
 "No Touch" – 6:20
 "Hack It Off" – 4:04
 "Forbidden Zone" – 8:41
 "She's Fading" – 8:00

Credits 
Manilla Road
 Mark Shelton – vocals, guitar
 Andrew Coss – bass, keyboards on track 2, vocals
 Aaron Brown – drums, vocals

Production
mixed at Miller Studio, North Newton, Kansas
Larry Funk – engineer
Aaron Brown – cover art

References 

1992 albums
Manilla Road albums